Nyam Nyam may refer to:
 Nyam Nyam (band), a 1980s post-punk band from Hull, England
 Zande people or Niam-Niam (also Nyam-Nyam)
 Tiny Teddy biscuits or Nyam-Nyam Teddy
 Nyam Nyam, a clasp on the Khedive's Sudan Medal